Iļja Ščaņicins (born 16 March 1984) is a Latvian retired footballer who played as a forward.

References

External links
 

Living people
1984 births
Latvian footballers
Footballers from Riga
Association football forwards
Skonto FC players
FK Auda players
FC Hämeenlinna players
FK Rīga players
JFK Olimps players
Latvian Higher League players
Veikkausliiga players
Latvia youth international footballers
Latvian expatriate footballers
Expatriate footballers in Finland
Latvian expatriate sportspeople in Finland
Latvia under-21 international footballers